Vikram Banerjee (born 20 March 1984 in Bradford, Yorkshire) is an English cricketer. He is a left-handed batsman and a left-arm slow bowler.

Background

Banerjee studied at King Edward's School, Birmingham and Downing College, Cambridge.

Professional playing career

Banerjee's first-class career started in 2004, playing the university varsity match for Cambridge University, with a second exactly a year later.  Banerjee represented Cambridge university in each year of his degree.

Banerjee made his County Championship debut for Gloucestershire in August 2006, just two months after representing Surrey in the Second XI Championship for the first and only time, picking up four wickets with the ball in the first innings. Banerjee's first innings for Gloucester saw him bowl economically with figures of 0-73 off 24 overs, as Gloucestershire headed for an innings defeat against Somerset. Overall Banerjee had a successful debut full season with best figures of 4-28 and 26 wickets collected in the year.

During the 2006 season Banerjee represented Dulwich in the Surrey Premiership and Bath in 2007 when not on county duty. Part of the ECB Emerging Players squad in the winters of 2006 and 2007 Vikram Banerjee has repeatedly been described as "one to watch"(Spin Magazine 2007).

Wisden Cricket for 2008 includes the following:"There is more to come from Banerjee, newly out of Cambridge University. He had a satisfying first full season with 26 victims for his attacking left-arm spin. If he can stay ahead of batsmen, who will be looking to find him out, he may develop into a top-class spinner."

2010 has seen much interest in Banerjee with a competitive sponsorship auction battle. In 2011 Banerjee played for Buckinghamshire in the Minor Counties Championship.

Post-playing Career

Banerjee joined the England and Wales Cricket board as Head of Strategy in 2017

References

External links

1984 births
Living people
Cricketers from Bradford
People educated at King Edward's School, Birmingham
Alumni of Downing College, Cambridge
English cricketers
Cambridge University cricketers
Gloucestershire cricketers
Buckinghamshire cricketers
Cambridge MCCU cricketers
English people of Bengali descent
British Asian cricketers
British sportspeople of Indian descent